The MacGregor Medal (also referred to as the MacGregor Memorial Medal) is awarded for valuable military intelligence through reconnaissance, exploration, survey or other similar activities of national importance. Awardees have included Survey of India personnel, military attaches, consuls, political officers and Indian Army, Navy and Air Force personnel (including British officers before Independence). Post 1947 the medal has only been awarded to military personnel. A few medals have been awarded for escapes from enemy-occupied territory while some medals were awarded for successful operations inside enemy territory. Sometimes the awardee would be conferred the medal years after the journey had been made. Currently the domains incorporated are land, sea and air. Over the years the necessity and opportunities related to exploration have declined and this in turn has been coupled with a decline in recommendations. In this light the eligibility has been expanded to adventure activities mountain and desert expeditions, rafting, world circumnavigation, polar expedition and flights.

History 
The medal was instituted in May 1887 to honour the memory of United Service Institution of India founder, Major General Sir Charles MacGregor. The original criteria for award of the medal were enunciated out on 3 July 1888 at Shimla at a meeting in the presence of Commander-in-Chief General Sir FS Roberts and the Viceroy of India. After the partition of British India into India and Pakistan, the award was adopted by India and continues to this day. 122 medals have been awarded: 7 gold medals to officers, 67 standard size silver medals to officers (including 5 VCOs and JCOs), and 48 reduced size silver medals to other ranks/soldiers. One British officer has been awarded the medal twice, A. S. Lancaster, as a major in 1938, and again as a colonel in 1946; and one British Indian, Shahzad Mir, first as Daffadar, in 1897, then again as Risaldar in 1906. For reconnaissance in 1891, Havildar Ramzan Khan, Punjab Frontier Force, was the first Indian to be awarded the medal.

Specifications 
There are three versions of the medal. The standard silver medal  without any attachments, the reduced gold medal  without any attachments and the reduced silver medal  with attachments to suspend around neck. The observe side contains an effigy of Major General Sir Charles MacGregor. Inscribed on the upper periphery is "Major General Sir Charles MacGregor KCB CSI CIE". Inscribed on the lower periphery is "In Memoriam 1887". The reserve side contains various figures of army personnel. Details of the awardee are inscribed on the outer rim. The colours of the ribbon are (from left to right) — Red, Green, Red, Green, Black, White, Black, Green, Red, Green, Red. The colours are based on the 'MacGregor tartan'.

Recent winners

Pre-1947 recipients 
Key

 No. – Award number
 Rank – Rank at the time of the award
 Year – Year in which the exploration for which the award was given took place

Only recipients with articles have been listed

Post-1947 recipients 
Awards were accompanied with entries in the Register for MacGregor Medal. The entry for Captain S.L. Tugnait, awarded for 1958, reads:

See also 

 Wing Commander Jag Mohan Nath
 Major General Rajendra Nath

References
Bibliography

 
 
 
 
 

USI Journals

External links
 United Service Institution of India, Official website
 Image of medal and ribbon awarded to Havildar Sein U.

Military awards and decorations of India
Indian awards
Reconnaissance